Dren is a small settlement in the hills above the left bank of the Kolpa River southwest of Kostel in southern Slovenia. The area is part of the traditional region of Lower Carniola and is now included in the Southeast Slovenia Statistical Region.

References

External links
Dren on Geopedia

Populated places in the Municipality of Kostel